The Cathedral Church of All Saints Derby, better known as Derby Cathedral, is a cathedral church in the city of Derby, England. In 1927, it was promoted from parish church status, to a cathedral, creating a seat for the Bishop of Derby, which new see was created in that year. The original church of All Saints was founded in the mid-10th century as a royal collegiate church, dedicated to All Saints. The main body of the church as it stands today is a Georgian rebuilding by James Gibbs, completed in 1725. The tower dates from the 16th century, and a retroquire was added in the 20th century.

History

All Saints' Church
The original church, dedicated to All Saints, was probably built in about 943 by the Anglo-Saxon King Edmund I as a royal collegiate church, of which building no trace survives. Following the Norman Conquest of 1066, and according to the Domesday Book of 1086, it belonged to the king, and was served by a college of seven priests.

The Saxon building probably became structurally unstable and was therefore demolished. A new building was constructed in the 14th century, which surviving drawings show was about the same size as the present building. On top of the tower are twelve large sculpted grotesque animal figures, three per face, and sculpted stone heads of two Green Men appear on either side of the main West Door at the base of the tower. The tower is built with Ashover Grit sandstone, sourced from nearby Duffield Bank quarry. 

in 1556, during the persecutions of Protestants during the reign of Queen Mary (1553–1558), Joan Waste was tried for heresy within the Church of All Saints, and was executed on the Burton Road in Derby.

The fabric of the church appears to have deteriorated severely from about 1650 and was in a ruinous state in 1700. In February 1723 the vicar, Dr. Michael Hutchinson, having decided that a new building was required, decided unilaterally to demolish the church and employed a gang of workmen to accomplish the task overnight. Having accepted this fait accompli handed to them, the Mayor and Corporation of Derby commenced fundraising for the building of a new church by inviting subscriptions for the purpose and made the first donation themselves. Dr Hutchinson expended much effort in fundraising, which exertion may have adversely affected his health. He made a significant personal financial contribution to the fund, and his efforts are recorded on a memorial tablet in the South Aisle. Having encountered numerous disputes, Hutchinson eventually resigned in 1728 and died about eighteen months later leaving numerous outstanding debts.

With the original 1530s tower retained, the rest of the church was rebuilt to a Neo-Classical design made in 1725 by the architect James Gibbs. In his Book of Architecture, Gibbs wrote as follows regarding All Saints' Church: "It is the more beautiful for having no galleries, which, as well as pews, clog up and spoil the insides of churches ... the plainness of this building makes it less expensive, and renders it more suitable to the old steeple". The first sermon was preached in the new church on 25 November 1725.

By Order in Council on 1 July 1927 All Saints' Church became a cathedral. The new building was later extended eastwards with the addition of a retroquire designed by Sebastian Comper, constructed between 1967 and 1972.

Monuments and furnishings
The cathedral's treasures include the 18th-century wrought iron rood screen manufactured by Robert Bakewell, for which he was paid £157.10.0d; a monument with effigy of Bess of Hardwick of Hardwick Hall and monumental brasses of her descendants the Cavendish family, later Dukes of Devonshire, including brasses of Henry Cavendish and of Georgiana Cavendish, Duchess of Devonshire. The entrance gates, moved to the cathedral from St Mary's Gate in 1957, were also made by Robert Bakewell. The gates were refurbished in 2012 and renamed the Queen Elizabeth II Gates to celebrate the Queen's Diamond Jubilee. Notable 20th-century additions are stained-glass windows designed by Ceri Richards, and a bronze crucifix by Ronald Pope.

Clock and carillon

In 1927 a new clock was installed by John Smith & Son, Derby clockmakers, replacing one reputed to have been made by George Ashmore in 1738, but by then so worn as to be beyond its useful life. Until March 1976 this timekeeper and associated parts had been mechanically driven by heavy weights which had to be wound manually, some of them daily. This work had been undertaken by John Smiths for many years, but rising costs caused the authorities to install an automatic winding mechanism to both the clock and the carillon which sounds the bells.

Derby Cathedral's clock has two dials, one facing West along St Mary's Gate, and one facing South down Irongate. Both are of stone and are 8 feet in diameter. They were restored and gilded in 1964, then again in the early 21st century. The 1964 restoration proved beyond doubt that the long metal tubes driven through the tower walls to operate the clock mechanism were actually gun barrels (cavalry carbines) dating from the 1745 'uprising' of Bonnie Prince Charlie.

The carillon is the mechanical instrument which drives the tunes played upon the cathedral's bells each day. It was installed by John Smith of Derby in 1931 to replace a machine of similar design, dating from the 17th century and subsequently enhanced towards the end of the 17th century by George Sorocold, a Derby millwright. The current machine plays a tune three times a day, and the seven tunes it plays are changed automatically each day. It is known that the tunes of the original machine were varied over the years, first by John Whitehurst at various times between 1745 and 1762, and then by John Smith in 1873.
There is documentary evidence to show that John Whitehurst was paid £3.3.0d for winding and care of the clock and carillon, although he is known to have paid from this sum the amount of £1.11.6d to a Mr Frost who did the actual daily winding of the carillon.

On 3 July 1976 one of the less well-known carillon tunes was replaced with the melody of "The Derby Ram", a regimental march associated with the Sherwood Foresters so that it would become a permanent reminder of the Regiment's association with the town and county of Derby.

The tunes are currently played at 9am, noon and 6pm as follows:
Sunday — Thaxted
Monday — Truro
Tuesday — The Shady Bowers
Wednesday — All Saints
Thursday — Lass of Paittie's Mill
Friday — The Highland Laddie
Saturday — The Derby Ram
They can be listened to live on a local webcam feed.
(The previous carillon played at 3, 6, 9, and 12 both night and day.)

Tower and bells
Derby Cathedral has the oldest ring of ten bells in the world. Most of them have been there since 1678 when the number of bells was increased from six to ten. The largest bell weighs 19 cwt (965 kg), its note is D-flat and it is over 500 years old, older than the tower itself. It is believed that it came from Dale Abbey in Erewash in Derbyshire at the Dissolution of the Monasteries. The youngest bell, no. 3, is dated 1693, so all the bells are over 300 years old. Bell no. 8 was in Ashbourne parish church until 1815. A carillon in the tower uses the same bells to provide a tune at 9 am, 12 pm, and 6 pm. The bells used to hang in a wooden frame. When the church became a cathedral in 1927, the bells were retuned and rehung at a lower level in a new metal frame.

On 28 October 1732, a Frenchman called Gillinoe 'flew' down on a rope from the top of All Saints' steeple. He did this on a number of occasions, landing variously at St Michael's church and at the bottom of St Mary's Gate. On one occasion an ass was sent down the rope, but it broke under its weight and a number of onlookers were injured.

On 25 July 1940 a wartime barrage balloon broke loose from its moorings during a heavy storm, and as it floated past its chain caught round one of the pinnacles on the tower and demolished the top half of the pinnacle.

In late 2005 it was discovered that a pair of peregrine falcons had taken up residence on the cathedral tower. In 2006 a nesting platform was installed, and they nested here in April. The same pair successfully reared chicks every year up to and including 2016.  However, on 27 March 2017 it became clear that a new male had taken over the nesting platform and ousted his predecessor who, by that time, was at least 14 years old.  It is not known whether the first male died of old age or was chased away or killed by the new one after a fight.  The female accepted the new male and together they produced four eggs, somewhat later than in previous years, three of which were successfully hatched, producing one male and two females. Webcams were installed in 2007, 2008 and 2013 to enable the birds to be seen at close range without being disturbed by human contact.

In 2009, more than 150 members of the Derby Mountain Rescue Team abseiled down the tower for charity. Further sponsored abseils have taken place every year since, and in 2012 this included Assistant Curate, Andy Trenier, and the Dean of Derby Cathedral, Dr John Davies.

Cathedral Centre
The Derby Cathedral Centre is opposite the west doors on Irongate. It was opened by Queen Elizabeth II. It includes a café, a bookshop and an exhibition space, featuring work by local artists. The Cathedral Centre also houses the cathedral offices and meeting rooms.

In 2017 the Cathedral Café won the annual Derby Food and Drinks Award for Best Customer Service.

Burials
 Bess of Hardwick
 Henry Cavendish
 Georgiana Cavendish, Duchess of Devonshire
 John Lombe
 William Ponsonby, 2nd Earl of Bessborough
 William Cavendish, 4th Duke of Devonshire
 Charlotte Cavendish, Marchioness of Hartington

Cathedral clergy

Dean and chapter
As of 5 December 2020:
 Dean — Peter Robinson (since 20 July 2020 installation)
 Sub-Dean and Canon Missioner — Elizabeth Thomson (since 2 March 2014 installation; Sub-Dean since 2018)
 Canon for Liturgy (i.e. Precentor) — Richard Andrews (since 2 September 2018 installation)
 Diocesan Canon — vacant since 5 May 2018; most recently held by the Diocesan Director of Mission and Ministry
 Diocesan Canon — vacant since ; most recently held by the Canon Chancellor and Diocesan Director of Curate Training

Other clergy
 Cathedral Chaplain — Adam Dickens (since 3 March 2014; Chaplain to the University of Derby)

Music

Organs and organists

Organ

In 1939, an organ was installed by John Compton of London, although it did not gain its impressive case (designed by Sebastian Comper) until 1963. It is played from a four manual console in the Consistory Court area of the cathedral.  This was overhauled in 1992. In 1973, an additional instrument was installed in the new retroquire (east end) by Cousans of Lincoln.

Organists
Between April 2013 and December 2014, Canon Peter Gould undertook a musical pilgrimage of 270 churches, in which he raised £7,478.78 over 39 tour days, performing to a collective audience of over 3,500 people. During the tour three church organs were found to be in a poor state.

On 4 January 2015, Canon Peter Gould resigned as Director of Music and was succeeded by Hugh Morris who had originally worked in Christchurch Priory.

On 1 September 2017, Edward Turner joined the staff at Derby Cathedral as organist.

See also
List of cathedrals in the United Kingdom
Grade I listed churches in Derbyshire
Grade I listed buildings in Derbyshire
Listed buildings in Derby (Arboretum Ward)

References

External links

Official site
Flickr images tagged Derby Cathedral
Derby Cathedral Peregrine Project
Live webcam feed with audio from Derby Cathedral tower

Anglican cathedrals in England
Churches in Derby
Carillons
James Gibbs buildings
Grade I listed buildings in Derby
Grade I listed cathedrals
Tourist attractions in Derby
Derby
English Gothic architecture in Derbyshire
Diocese of Derby
Neoclassical church buildings in England